IWG may refer to:

 Inch of Water Gauge, pressure unit corresponding to 2.54 cmH2O or approximately 249 Pa
"I Wanna Go", song by Britney Spears
Interagency Working Group such as the 
Nazi War Crimes and Japanese Imperial Government Records Interagency Working Group
Interagency Working Group on Youth Programs
IWG plc, a global provider of office space
Irish Workers' Group